Macarius III may refer to:

Macarius III Zaim (died 1672)
Pope Macarius III of Alexandria (1872–1945)

See also
 Makarios III (1913–1977)